This is a list of current and former churches in the Roman Catholic Diocese of Davenport, in the U.S. state of Iowa. The diocese includes 80 churches located throughout southeastern Iowa. The cathedral church of the diocese is Sacred Heart Cathedral in Davenport. This list also includes two university chapels.

Clinton Deanery

Davenport Deanery

Grinnell Deanery

Iowa City Deanery

Keokuk Deanery

Ottumwa Deanery

Former churches

References

 
Davenport